The 1994 ITU Triathlon World Cup was a series of triathlon races organised by the International Triathlon Union (ITU) for elite-level triathletes. There were ten races held in eight countries, all of them held over a distance of 1500 m swim, 40 km cycle, 10 km run (an Olympic-distance triathlon).

Results

Amakusa, Japan 
 29 May 1994 (US$20,000)

Osaka, Japan 
 5 June 1994 (US$50,000)

Nendaz, Switzerland 
 19 June 1994 (US$40,000)

Whistler, Canada 
 10 July 1994 (US$20,000)

Cleveland, United States 
 7 August 1994 (US$40,000)

Wilkes-Barre, United States 
 14 August 1994 (US$20,000)

Ilhéus, Brazil 
 17 September 1994 (US$20,000)

Gérardmer, France 
 25 September 1994 (US$20,000)

San Sebastián, Spain 
 2 October 1994 (US$20,000)

Ixtapa, Mexico 
 30 October 1994 (US$20,000)

Final ranking

See also 
 1994 ITU Triathlon World Championships

References 
 Results

ITU Triathlon World Cup
World Cup